The 1998–99 season was the 100th season in the history of SV Werder Bremen and the club's 18th consecutive season in the top flight of German football.

Competitions

Overall record

Bundesliga

League table

Results by round

Matches

Source:

DFB-Pokal

UEFA Intertoto Cup

References

SV Werder Bremen seasons
SV Werder Bremen